The 1998 Round Australia Trial, officially the Playstation Rally Round Australia was the fourteenth and last running of the Round Australia Trial. The rally took place between 6 and 27 September 1998. The event covered 18,500 kilometres around Australia. It was won by Bruce Garland and Harry Suzuki, driving a Holden Jackaroo..

Results

References

Rally competitions in Australia
Round Australia Trial